Karl Wild (23 November 1917 – 27 April 1975) was a German ice hockey player. He competed in the men's tournament at the 1952 Winter Olympics.

References

External links
 

1917 births
1975 deaths
German ice hockey players
Germany men's national ice hockey team coaches
Ice hockey players at the 1952 Winter Olympics
Olympic ice hockey players of Germany
Sportspeople from Munich